Lillian Jessie Chrystall  (née Laidlaw; 1 March 1926 – 24 February 2022) was a New Zealand architect. She was the first woman to receive a national New Zealand Institute of Architects award.

Biography 
Chrystall was born in the Auckland suburb of Herne Bay on 1 March 1926, one of three children of businessman Robert Laidlaw and American-born Lillian Viola Irene Laidlaw (née Watson). One of her brothers was Lincoln Laidlaw, who founded the New Zealand toy manufacturing company, Lincoln Industries. She was raised in Herne Bay, and was educated at Bayfield School and Auckland Girls' Grammar School. Chrystall studied architecture at the University of Auckland and after graduating was appointed the School of Architecture's first female instructor. 

From 1950 to 1954, Chrystall worked in England and France, then returned to New Zealand and started her own architecture practice, Lillian Laidlaw Architects. In the late 1950s, her husband joined the practice and the business was re-named Chrystall Architects.

Chrystall also served on community organisations and was a founding member of the Auckland Zonta Club. She was the first woman on the Board of Trustees at the Auckland Savings Bank (ASB) and in 1983 became the first female president of the ASB Board.

Recognition 
In 1967, Chrystall won a Bronze Medal from the New Zealand Institute of Architects for the Yock House in Ngāpuhi Road, Remuera, which she had designed in 1964. In 2013 she received an Enduring Architecture Award in the Auckland Architecture Awards for the same building. Architecture + Women New Zealand named one of their annual excellence awards, the Chrystall Excellence Award, in her honour.

In the 1989 New Year Honours, Chrystall was appointed an Officer of the Order of the British Empire, for public services.

Personal life 
Chrystall married David Chrystall, who was also an architect, and they had three children. She died on 24 February 2022 at the age of 95.

References 

1926 births
2022 deaths
University of Auckland alumni
New Zealand architects
People educated at Auckland Girls' Grammar School
New Zealand Officers of the Order of the British Empire
New Zealand women architects